Transair Sweden AB (ICAO: TB) was a Swedish charter airline that operated until 1981.

History

Transair Sweden began as Nordisk Aerotransport AB in 1950 with the purpose of flying newspapers from Stockholm to other locations in Sweden using Airspeed Oxford aircraft.

In 1953 passenger charters began using Douglas DC-3's, and soon after the name was changed to Transair Sweden. In 1957 the Curtiss-Wright C-46 Commando cargo aircraft was introduced. Douglas DC-6 acquired from SAS were introduced in 1959.

From 1965 nine Douglas DC-7B were bought from Eastern Airlines and were added to the fleet for charter use and for flights during the civil war in Congo on behalf of the United Nations.

Freight flights on behalf of SAS were begun to cities such as Malmo, Copenhagen, Hamburg, Amsterdam, and Paris. In 1967 Boeing 727-134s were acquired but those were not kept very long. However, a year later Transair was bought by Svenska Handelsbank and financing was introduced to acquire jet aircraft again. Shortly thereafter SAS took a majority holding in Transair Sweden and the airline was kept flying independently under its own colors taking tourists to Spain, the Canary Islands, and other Mediterranean destinations. In 1981 SAS sold all the 727s and the employees were integrated into SAS.

Fleet 

3 - Airspeed Oxford
3 - Douglas DC-3
11 - Curtiss C-46 Commando
3 - Douglas DC-6
6 - Douglas DC-6B
11 - Douglas DC-7B
4 - Boeing 727-134 and 727-30C

Business management

CEOs
1959-1966 - Gösta Ellhammar

Chairman of the Board
1958-1963 - Knut Bjuhr
1963-1966 - Bengt Elmgren
1973-1978 - Knut Hagrup

Accidents and incidents 
 September 18, 1961: Secretary General of the United Nations Dag Hammarskjöld and 15 other passengers and crew died when their DC-6B (registration SE-BDY) crashed near Ndola, Northern Rhodesia (now Zambia). The plane was owned by Transair Sweden and operated for the UN.

Footnotes

References

Notes

Bibliography

External links

Historical Site
Website
Another historical website

Defunct airlines of Sweden
Airlines established in 1950
Airlines disestablished in 1981